Beaver Lake, now drained, was one of the largest lakes in Indiana.  It was a shallow lake covering tens of thousands of acres and did not exceed fifteen feet in depth.  Beaver Lake was home and/or water supply for scores of species of fish, waterfowl and mammals.  Among the animals native to the area was a healthy Bald Eagle population .  Before the settlement of Newton County, Indiana it provided food, furs and shelter for Native Americans.  During Indiana's frontier days the lake continued to provide food and furs for the early settlers.  Thanks to its remoteness, criminals were known to hideout at the infamous Bogus Island located on the Lake.  In 1853, a ditch connecting it to the nearby Kankakee River was dug and the process of draining the lake began.  Until the lake was drained and the river was dredged, the Kankakee River and Beaver Lake were part of North America's largest inland swamp.  It took a little over twenty years to completely drain the lake.  Once it was drained the land was converted to farmland.

The land was farmed until the late 1990s.  At that time the Nature Conservancy purchased 7,200 acres in and around the Beaver Lake basin and began restoring the area to native prairie.  Today, the Nature Conservancy maintains a trail along what was once the shore of Beaver Lake.

References 

Newton County, Indiana
Former lakes of the United States